(literally little traffic light man, diminutive of Ampelmann ) is the symbol shown on pedestrian signals in Germany.

The  is a beloved symbol in former East Germany, "enjoy[ing] the privileged status of being one of the few features of East Germany to have survived the end of the Iron Curtain with his popularity unscathed." After the fall of the Berlin Wall, the  acquired cult status and became a popular souvenir item in the tourism business.

Concept and design

The first traffic lights at pedestrian crossings were erected in the 1950s, and many countries developed different designs (which were eventually standardised). At that time, traffic lights were the same for cars, bicycles and pedestrians. The East Berlin  was created in 1961 by traffic psychologist Karl Peglau (1927–2009) as part of a proposal for a new traffic lights layout. Peglau criticised the fact that the standard colours of the traffic lights (red, yellow, green) did not provide for road users who were unable to differentiate between colours (10 percent of the total population); and that the lights themselves were too small and too weak when competing against luminous advertising and sunlight. Peglau proposed retaining the three colours while introducing intuitive shapes for each coloured light. This idea received strong support from many sides, but Peglau's plans were doomed by the high costs involved in replacing existing traffic light infrastructure.

Unlike motor traffic, pedestrian traffic has no constraints for age or health (physical or mental), and therefore must allow for children, elderly people and the handicapped. Peglau therefore resorted to the realistic-concrete scheme of a little man that is comprehensible for everyone and appeals to archetypical shapes. The thick outstretched arms of the frontal-standing red man is associated with the function of a blocking barricade to signal "stop", while the side-facing green man with his wide-paced legs is associated with a dynamic arrow, signalling the permission to "go ahead". The yellow light was abandoned because of generally unhurried pedestrian traffic.

However, the man's "perky", "cheerful" and potentially "petit bourgeois" hat – inspired by a summer photo of Erich Honecker in a straw hat – was retained, to Peglau's surprise. The prototypes of the  traffic lights were built at the VEB-Leuchtenbau Berlin.

The  was officially introduced on 13 October 1961 in Berlin, at which time the media attention and public interest focused on the new traffic lights, not the symbols. The first  were produced as cheap decal pictures.

The  reminded others of a childlike figure with big head and short legs, or a religious leader.<ref name=fruehling>{{Cite book|last=Heckhausen |first=Markus |chapter=Ampelmännchen im zweiten Frühling |pages=52–57 |title=nnchen in Rostock.}}</ref>

The  proved so popular that parents and teachers initiated the symbol to become part of road safety education for children in the early 1980s. The East German Ministry of the Interior had the idea to bring the two traffic light figures to life and turn them into advisors. The  were introduced with much media publicity. They appeared in strip cartoons, also in situations without traffic lights. The red  appeared in potentially dangerous environments, and the green  was an advisor. Partly animated Ampelmännchen stories with the name  were broadcast once a month as part of the East German children's bedtime television programme Sandmännchen, which had one of the largest viewing audiences in East Germany. The animated  stories raised international interest, and the Czech festival for road safety education films awarded  the Special Award by the Jury and the Main Prize for Overall Accomplishments'' in 1984.

History after reunification

Following the German reunification in 1990, there were attempts to standardise all traffic signs to the West German forms. East German street signs and traffic signs were dismantled and replaced because of differing fonts in the former two German countries. The East German education programmes featuring the  vanished. This led to calls to save the East German  as a part of the East German culture. The first solidarity campaigns for the  took place in Berlin in early 1995.

When he was looking for new design possibilities in 1995, he had the idea to collect dismantled  and build lamps. But he had difficulty finding old  and eventually contacted the former  (now ) regarding their excess stock. The company was still producing , and liked Heckhausen's marketing ideas. The public embraced Heckhausen's first six lamp models. Local newspapers published full-page articles, followed by articles in national newspapers and designer magazines. The successful German daily soap opera  used the  lamp in their coffeehouse set. Designer Karl Peglau explained the public reaction in 1997:
It is presumably their special, almost indescribable aura of human snugness and warmth, when humans are comfortably touched by this traffic symbol figure and find a piece of honest historical identification, giving the  the right to represent a positive aspect of a failed social order.

The protests were successful, and the  returned to pedestrian crossings. They can now also be seen in some western districts of Berlin. Some western German cities such as Saarbrücken and Heidelberg have since adopted the design for some intersections. Peter Becker, marshal of Saarbrücken, explained that lights of the East German  have greater signal strength than West German traffic lights, and "in our experience people react better to the East German  than the West German ones." In Heidelberg, however, a government department asked the city to stop the installation of more East German , citing standards in road traffic regulations.

Heckhausen continued to incorporate the  design into products and had an assortment of over forty Ampelmännchen souvenir products in 2004, reportedly earning €2 million yearly. In the meantime, east German businessman Joachim Rossberg had also used the distinctive traffic symbol as a logo, and claimed to make €50,000 per year from merchandise. Heckhausen appealed to a Leipzig court in 2005 over the marketing rights, suing Rossberg for failing at making full use of his marketing rights; German legislature rules state that if no use of marketing rights is made for five years, the rights can be cancelled. Rossberg only retained the right to use the symbol to market liqueur, and may no longer use the logo on beer and T-shirts. The court case was later seen by some as part of the cultural and political struggle between residents of the two parts of the reunified country, in which the underdog East generally lost.

Berlin started to modernize its traffic lights from using regular light bulbs to LED technology in early 2006, which promised better visibility and lower maintenance costs.

Variations
There are three  variations in modern-day Germany – the old East German version, the old West German version, and the pan-German  introduced in 1992. Each German state holds the right to determine the version used. East Germans have changed the look of Ampelmännchen traffic lights as a joke since the early 1980s; this turned into media-effective efforts to call attention to the vanishing East German  in the 1990s. The  on several traffic lights in Erfurt were changed through manipulation of the template, showing  carrying backpacks or cameras.

Art collective Ztohoven 

Roman Tic (a pseudonym playing with "romantic") of the art collective Ztohoven ("(The way) Out of shit") changed some pedestrian traffic lights in the daylight hours of 8 April 2007 in five hours work, with a ladder and wearing red overalls. He used different motifs, including men and women (e.g. drinking, urinating).

Inclusive traffic lights 
On 11 May 2015, before the Life Ball and the Eurovision Song Contest in Vienna, the city changed some traffic lights to ""; these are designs with homo- and heterosexual couples, hugging or holding hands. In June 2015, Salzburg (at Staatsbrücke) and Linz (at Mozartkreuzung) followed suit with the same designs. However, in December 2015, a city traffic minister of the party FPÖ dismounted the privately sponsored faceplates, deeming them unnecessary.

Tribute
On 13 October 2017, Google celebrated the 56th anniversary of the Traffic Light Man with a Google Doodle.

See also
 Ostalgie
 Road traffic safety
 Xiaolüren, an animated traffic light system in Taiwan

References

Further reading

External links

 Original Ampelmann Company which manufactured them originally
 Ampelmann at ampelmann.de

1961 introductions
East German culture
Ostalgie
Pedestrian crossing components
Road transport in Germany
Transport in East Germany